Necrophobic is a Swedish blackened death metal band.

History
The band was formed in 1989 by drummer Joakim Sterner and now-deceased guitarist David Parland. It is believed that the band named themselves after a Slayer song from the 1986 seminal album Reign in Blood. The pair played with a 'revolving door' lineup of musicians until the permanent addition of bassist Tobias Sidegård. This addition occurred prior to recording their debut 7-inch single, The Call, in early 1992.

With this lineup and the addition of Anders Strokirk on vocals, who replaced Stefan Harrvik (who had sung on the Unholy Prophecies demo and The Call 7-inch EP), the band entered Sunlight Studio in March 1993 and recorded their debut album The Nocturnal Silence. The band had previously worked with the Wild Rags label and store for its singles.

Following the addition of second guitarist Martin Halfdahn, Necrophobic released a four-song extended play, Spawned by Evil, in 1996. This was a teaser for the full-length release, Darkside, which came out later that same year. This album featured a guest appearance by Jon Nödtveidt of Dissection on the song Nailing the Holy One. The Third Antichrist was released in fall 2000 through Black Mark Production. A switch to Hammerheart Records led to Bloodhymns. In 2006, Necrophobic released Hrimthursum on Regain Records/Candlelight USA, and Death to All was issued in May 2009 and won the title of "Album of the Month" on the Metallian.com webzine. This album was the band's second album for Regain Records. Necrophobic also released Satanic Blasphemies on Regain Records, which is a compilation of their early material. The Slow Asphyxiation and Unholy Prophecies demos are featured, as well as The Call 7-inch EP.

The band announced their new album release for Womb of Lilithu which was released on October 25, 2013, in Europe and October 29, 2013, in the United States.

In July 2020, the band announced the release of their album Dawn of the Damned on October 9.

Band members

Current members
 Joakim Sterner – drums (1989–present)
 Anders Strokirk – vocals (1992–1994, 2014–present)
 Sebastian Ramstedt – guitar (1996–2011, 2016–present)
 Johan Bergebäck – guitar (2001–2011, 2016–present)
 Allan Lundholm – bass (2019–present)

Former members
 David Parland – guitar (1989–1996, 2000–2001; died 2013)
 Stefan Zander – bass, vocals (1989–1990)
 Stefan Harrvik – bass (1990–1991), vocals (1990–1993)
 Tobias Sidegård – bass (1991–2007), vocals (1994–2013)
 Joakim Stabel – bass (1991)
 Martin Halfdan – guitar (1993–2000)
 Fredrik Folkare – guitar (2011–2016)
 Robert Sennebäck – guitar (2011–2013)
 Alex Friberg – bass (2008–2019)

Timeline

Discography

Albums 
 The Nocturnal Silence (1993)
 Darkside (1997)
 The Third Antichrist (1999)
 Bloodhymns (2002)
 Hrimthursum (2006)
 Death to All (2009)
 Womb of Lilithu (2013)
 Mark of the Necrogram (2018)
 Dawn of the Damned (2020)

EPs 
 The Call (1993)
 Spawned by Evil (1996)
 Tour EP 2003 (2003)

Demos 
 Slow Asphyxiation (1990) on Witchhunt Records - Believe in Church and Agonize
 Retaliation (1990) on Witchhunt Records - Believe in Church and Agonize
 Unholy Prophecies (1991)

Other 
 Satanic Blasphemies - Compilation (2008)
 Satanic Blasphemies - Boxed Set (2008)
 Satanic Prophecies - Remastered Boxed Set (2018)

References

External links 
 
 "Blinded by Light, Enlightened by Darkness" music video
 Sebastian Ramstedt interviewed by Highwire Daze (2006)

Swedish musical groups
Blackened death metal musical groups
Swedish black metal musical groups
Swedish melodic death metal musical groups
Musical groups established in 1989
Musical quintets
Season of Mist artists
Black Mark Production artists